Kate Elizabeth Russell (born 1984) is an American author. Her debut novel, My Dark Vanessa, was published in 2020 and became a national bestseller.

Biography 
Russell was raised in the town of Clifton, Maine, attending John Bapst Memorial High School in Bangor, Maine. She subsequently studied as an undergraduate at the University of Maine at Farmington, earning a B.F.A. in creative writing in 2006, and went on to earn an M.F.A. from Indiana University and a Ph.D. in creative writing from the University of Kansas.

My Dark Vanessa
Russell's first novel offers a fictional account of a traumatic sexual relationship between its protagonist, Vanessa Wye, and Jacob Strane. Wye is 15 years old and a lonely student at boarding school when Strane, her 42-year-old English teacher, begins grooming her for a sexual relationship which will come to cast an appalling shadow over her life. The novel is a first-person narrative, jumping forward and backward in time amongst 2000, 2007, and 2017, with this last year affording Russell the social context of the Me Too movement.

It is implied that Vanessa is, at least in part, an unreliable narrator owing to her reluctance to see herself as a victim or Strane as a predator. 

My Dark Vanessa was a national bestseller. It was selected for translation and publication in 22 countries, and optioned for the screen. Reviewed positively in a number of publications, My Dark Vanessa brought Russell into a public conversation regarding the novel's treatment of abusive sexual relationships, as well as an individual's right to privacy regarding past trauma.

Russell was shortlisted for the 2021 Dylan Thomas Prize for My Dark Vanessa.

Controversy
My Dark Vanessa occasioned pre-publication controversy when author Wendy C. Ortiz complained that Russell's novel had received different support from that given to Ortiz's memoir concerning a relationship with her 8th grade English teacher. Ortiz further alleged that My Dark Vanessa, which she had not read, possessed 'eerie story similarities' to her memoir. As was reported by the Associated Press, 'Reviewers who looked at both books saw no evidence of plagiarism.' Nevertheless, in response to social media comments, and in the wake of the controversy over American Dirt, Oprah Winfrey, who had originally tapped My Dark Vanessa as a selection for her influential Book Club, rescinded the selection.

As a result of the accusations of plagiarism and appropriation, Russell made a public statement disclosing that My Dark Vanessa had been inspired by her own experiences with sexual abuse as a teenager.

Bibliography
My Dark Vanessa (2020)

References 

21st-century American women writers
Novelists from Maine
1984 births
Living people
21st-century American novelists
People from Penobscot County, Maine
University of Kansas alumni
Indiana University alumni
American women novelists
University of Maine at Farmington alumni